Simon Paul Webster (born 20 January 1964) is an English former professional footballer who played as a defender in the Football League for Tottenham Hotspur, Exeter City, Huddersfield Town, Sheffield United, Charlton Athletic, West Ham United, Oldham Athletic and Derby County. He also spent time on loan to Norwich City without appearing for the first team, and played non-league football for St Albans City.

During his spell at Sheffield United, Webster broke his leg in two places, an injury re-inflicted by a training-ground tackle by Julian Dicks within weeks of joining West Ham United. Although Webster was able to play again, he chose to retire from the professional game in November 1995 to study physiotherapy. Once qualified, he worked for West Ham United and Gillingham.

References

External links
 

1964 births
Living people
People from Hinckley
Footballers from Leicestershire
English footballers
Association football defenders
Tottenham Hotspur F.C. players
Exeter City F.C. players
Norwich City F.C. players
Huddersfield Town A.F.C. players
Sheffield United F.C. players
Charlton Athletic F.C. players
West Ham United F.C. players
Oldham Athletic A.F.C. players
Derby County F.C. players
St Albans City F.C. players
Premier League players
English Football League players
Association football physiotherapists
West Ham United F.C. non-playing staff
Gillingham F.C. non-playing staff